Serena Williams and Venus Williams were the defending champions from 2010; however, they were unable to defend their title because of Serena's foot injury, sustained in the middle of the 2010 season.

Gisela Dulko and Flavia Pennetta won the title beating Victoria Azarenka and Maria Kirilenko 2–6, 7–5, 6–1 in the final. This was to be Dulko and Pennetta's only Grand Slam doubles title.

Seeds

Draw

Finals

Top half

Section 1

Section 2

Bottom half

Section 3

Section 4

References

External links
 2011 Australian Open – Women's draws and results at the International Tennis Federation

Women's Doubles
Australian Open - Women's Doubles
Australian Open (tennis) by year – Women's doubles
2011 in Australian women's sport